National Highway 766C, commonly referred to as NH 766C is a national highway in  India. It is a spur road of National Highway 66. NH-766C traverses the state of Karnataka in India.

Route 

Byndur (Baindur), Kollur, Hosanagara, Anandapur, Ananthapura, Shikaripura, Masur, Ranibennur.

Junctions  

  Terminal near Baindur.
  near Anandapur.
  Terminal near Ranibennur.

See also 

 List of National Highways in India
 List of National Highways in India by state

References

External links 

 NH 766C on OpenStreetMap

National highways in India
National Highways in Karnataka